Sammy Siegler (born March 21, 1973) is an American rock drummer, notable for his many contributions to the New York hardcore scene.

Discography

With Project X
 Straight Edge Revenge (1987)

With Side By Side
 New York City Hardcore - Together compilation (1987, Revelation Records)
 You're Only Young Once... (1988, Revelation Records)
 reissued in 1997
 New York City Hardcore - The Way It Is compilation (1988, Revelation Records)

With Youth of Today
 We're Not In This Alone (1988)
 Youth of Today (1990)

With Judge
 Chung King Can Suck It (1989, Revelation Records)
 Bringin' It Down (1989, Revelation Records)
 There Will Be Quiet... (1990)
 What It Meant: The Complete Discography (2005, Revelation Records)

With CIV
 CIV (1995)
 All Twisted (1995)
 Set Your Goals (1995, Revelation Records)
 Anti-Matter (1996)
 Thirteen Day Getaway (1998, Atlantic Records)

With Glassjaw
 Everything You Ever Wanted to Know About Silence (2000, Roadrunner Records)

With Rival Schools
 Onelinedrawing split with Onelinedrawing (2001)
 United by Fate (2001, Island Records)
 Pedals (album) (2011, Atlantic/Photo Finish Records)
 Found (2013, Shop Radio Cast)

With Nightmare of You
 Nightmare of You (2005, East West Records)
 Bang (2007, The Bevonshire Label)

With Limp Bizkit
 The Unquestionable Truth (Part 1) EP (2005, Geffen Records)
 (provided drums for tracks 1, 2, 3 and 6 due to regular drummer John Otto's drug rehab)

With Tech N9ne
 Therapy (2013)

With Head Automatica
 Swan Damage (TBA)

With Constant Elevation
 ''Constant Elevation (2019, Revelation Records)

Producing
He produced the self-titled 2008 EP by the King Left.

References

External links
 Sammy Siegler at BandToBand.com
 2012 Audio interview with Sammy Siegler on the Podcast I'd Hit That

Living people
Place of birth missing (living people)
1973 births
20th-century American drummers
American male drummers
21st-century American drummers
20th-century American male musicians
21st-century American male musicians
Head Automatica members
CIV (band) members
Youth of Today members
Project X (band) members